The Hollywood Revue of 1929, or simply The Hollywood Revue, is a 1929 American pre-Code musical comedy film released by Metro-Goldwyn-Mayer. It was the studio's second feature-length musical, and one of their earliest sound films. Produced by Harry Rapf and Irving Thalberg and directed by Charles Reisner, it features nearly all of MGM's stars in a two-hour revue that includes three segments in Technicolor. The masters of ceremonies are Conrad Nagel and Jack Benny.

At the 2nd Academy Awards, the film received a Best Picture nomination (its sole nomination) but lost to another Irving Thalberg MGM production, The Broadway Melody.

Production 
Unlike M-G-M's imposing feature films, which always boasted strong story values, The Hollywood Revue of 1929 was a plotless parade of variety acts. Conrad Nagel, interviewed for the book The Real Tinsel, recalled, "Everybody thought Harry Rapf was crazy for making it." Billed as an "All-Star Musical Extravaganza", the film includes performances by once and future stars, including Joan Crawford singing and dancing on stage. (She later remarked, "Revue was one of those let's-throw-everyone-on-the-lot-into-a musical things, but I did a good song-and-dance number."). Other segments feature Gus Edwards, John Gilbert, Norma Shearer, Lionel Barrymore, Buster Keaton, Marie Dressler, Bessie Love, Marion Davies, Anita Page, and the comedy team of Karl Dane and George K. Arthur.

Highlights of the film are a comedy routine starring Stan Laurel and Oliver Hardy as inept magicians, and a variety of musical performances. One of these is the debut of "Singin' in the Rain", performed initially by Cliff Edwards as "Ukulele Ike,'" and later performed at the end of the film by the entire cast. This latter all-star color sequence was a last-minute addition to the film, shot late at night on June 10, 1929, just ten days before the premiere at Grauman's Chinese Theatre. The only major M-G-M stars missing from the revue are Greta Garbo, Ramon Novarro, and Lon Chaney, although Chaney is referred to by name in one of the songs performed and Garbo is spoken of during one of the introductory dialogues. Only one sequence was cut from the film: three songs by The Brox Sisters, which was recycled into a short subject, Gems of MGM. Another sequence, a parody of the Albertina Rasch ballet's "pearl dance" by Marie Dressler, was planned but not shot (as the film's production records reveal). Instead, the number was replaced by one featuring Buster Keaton, though Dressler did pose for stills wearing a Lady Godiva wig.

The film is sometimes cited, as on the DVD release of the 1952 Singin' in the Rain, as the film that led to the downfall of Gilbert's career. Gilbert, a popular silent film actor best known for his work opposite Garbo, possessed a pleasant, tenor speaking voice which did not always match his heroic, dashing screen image. In Hollywood Revue he plays the balcony scene from Romeo and Juliet with Norma Shearer, first straight, then for laughs with contemporary slang. It is possible, though, that the negative effect of the film on Gilbert's career has been overstated, since many contemporary reviews made no criticism of his performance. His problems really began with the next two films he made, His Glorious Night (1929) and Redemption (1930).

Cast

Musical numbers 
The circulating print of The Hollywood Revue of 1929 runs as follows:

Act I 
 "The Palace of Minstrel" sung and danced by a minstrel chorus
 "Masters of Ceremonies" Jack Benny introduces Conrad Nagel. Charles King and Cliff Edwards interfere.
 "Got a Feeling for You" sung by Joan Crawford
 "Old Folks at Home" sung by chorus
 "Old Black Joe" sung by chorus
 "Low-Down Rhythm" sung and danced by June Purcell
 "Your Mother and Mine" sung by Charles King
 "You Were Meant for Me" "sung" by Conrad Nagel (whose voice was dubbed by Charles King) to Anita Page
 "Nobody but You" sung by Cliff Edwards
 "Your Mother and Mine" played by Jack Benny on his violin with interjections from Karl Dane and George K. Arthur
 "Cut Up" comedy skit featuring William Haines ripping up Jack Benny's suit
 "I Never Knew I Could Do a Thing Like That" sung by Bessie Love
 "For I'm the Queen" sung by Marie Dressler, assisted by Polly Moran
 "Magic Act" introduced by Jack Benny, featuring Laurel and Hardy as magicians in a comedy skit (their first appearance in a sound feature film)
 "Military March" with Marion Davies singing "Oh, What a Man" and "Tommy Atkins on Parade" followed by military drill and dancing. The Brox Sisters conclude this number singing "Strike Up the Band"

Intermission 
 "Nobody But You", "Your Mother and Mine", and "I've Got a Feeling for You" by the orchestra

Act II 
 "The Pearl Ballet" sung by James Burrows, danced by Beth Laemmle and the Albertina Rasch ballet
 "The Dance of the Sea", an "underwater" dance performed by Buster Keaton
 "Lon Chaney's Gonna Get You If You Don't Watch Out" sung by Gus Edwards
 "The Adagio Dance" with the Natova Company
 "Romeo and Juliet" (in two-color Technicolor) with John Gilbert and Norma Shearer, with Lionel Barrymore as director
 "Singin' in the Rain" introduced by Cliff Edwards, with The Brox Sisters
 "Charlie, Gus, and Ike" with Charles King, Gus Edwards, and Cliff Edwards
 "Marie, Polly, and Bess" with Marie Dressler, Polly Moran, and Bessie Love
 "Orange Blossom Time" (in two-color Technicolor), sung by Charles King to Myrtle McLaughlin, danced by the Albertina Rasch Ballet Company
 "Singin' in the Rain" (finale) (in two-color Technicolor), sung by entire cast

Reception 
The film, which was shot in 25 days with a budget of US$426,000, was popular with audiences and critics alike, especially in its initial big-city engagements. "Brimming over with good fun and catchy music", Mordaunt Hall of The New York Times wrote. Variety called it "the top novelty film to be turned out to date....If the theater booths give it an even break, nothing can stop it." Film Daily reported, "A smash and a wow. Smart revue with plenty of comedy beautifully dressed and a cast that is gilt-edged." John Mosher of The New Yorker called it "the most extravagant and extensive musical comedy so far presented by the talking pictures, and is in itself a complete evening's entertainment."

The film went on to make a profit of $1.1 million and was considered for the Academy Award for Best Picture (there were no official nominations at that point in Motion Picture Association of America history). Producer Rapf tried to follow it up with another revue, The Hollywood Revue of 1930, which was changed during production to The March of Time, and finally abandoned. Musical numbers already shot for the film were edited into M-G-M short subjects of the early 1930s.

Alternate version
Some sources list the original running time of Hollywood Revue of 1929 as 130 minutes. At least two sequences in the original roadshow version are missing from current prints: an opening recitation by the showgirls who are seen posing in the "Hollywood Revue" sign after the opening credits, and the appearance of Nils Asther, who assisted Jack Benny in introducing the final "Orange Blossom" number.

Preservation 
The film survives intact with its original Technicolor sequences. It was released on laserdisc in the 1990s from MGM/UA Home Video, and on DVD in 2009 through the Warner Archive Collection.

See also 
 List of early color feature films
 Lionel Barrymore filmography

References

External links 
 
 
 
 
 
 The Hollywood Revue of 1929 at the International Buster Keaton Society

1929 films
1929 musical comedy films
1920s color films
American musical comedy films
American black-and-white films
1920s English-language films
Films directed by Charles Reisner
Films produced by Irving Thalberg
Film revues
Metro-Goldwyn-Mayer films
Films produced by Harry Rapf
1920s American films